Pedro Antonio Porro Sauceda (born 13 September 1999) is a Spanish professional footballer who plays as a right back or right winger for  club Tottenham Hotspur, on loan from Primeira Liga club Sporting CP, and the Spain national team.

He started his career with Girona's reserve team Peralda, before being promoted to the first-team in 2017. In 2019, Porro signed for Premier League side Manchester City for a reported fee of €13 million (£11 million). He was consecutively loaned to La Liga side Real Valladolid and Portuguese Primeira Liga club Sporting CP on an initial two-year loan deal, where he won a double of the Primeira Liga and Taça da Liga, while being named in the Primeira Liga Team of the Year; it was made permanent at the end of his second season. 

Porro first appeared with the Spain under-21s in March 2019, aged 19. He made his senior international debut in 2021 and was included in the squad for the 2021 UEFA Nations League Finals in Italy, in which Spain finished as runner-up.

Club career

Early career
Born in Don Benito, Badajoz, Extremadura, Porro represented Gimnástico de Don Benito and Rayo Vallecano before joining Girona on 10 August 2017. He reportedly rejected Real Madrid, Atlético Madrid and Bayern Munich to sign for the Catalans.

Girona
On 28 November 2017, before even appearing with the reserves, Porro made his first team debut by coming on as a late substitute for goalscorer Johan Mojica in a 1–1 away draw against Levante, for the season's Copa del Rey. He made his first appearance for the B-side five days later, playing the last seven minutes in a 0–0 Segunda División B draw at Ebro.

Porro scored his first senior goals on 6 May 2018, netting a brace in a 3–0 away win against Villarreal B. On 2 July, he renewed his contract until 2022, and featured the most of the pre-season as a right back.

Porro made his La Liga debut on 17 August 2018, starting in the right back in a 0–0 home draw against Real Valladolid. The following day, he extended his contract for a further year.

Porro established himself as a starter under Eusebio Sacristán, being a first-choice ahead of Aday Benítez and replacing departed Pablo Maffeo. He scored his first professional goal on 31 January 2019, netting his team's only in a 1–3 cup loss at Real Madrid.

Manchester City
On 8 August 2019, Porro signed for Manchester City, for a reported fee of £11 million. Upon signing for Manchester City, Porro was immediately loaned to Real Valladolid in La Liga for one season. The side had an option to make a permanent move, and after playing 13 league games, helping the Pucelanos to a 13th place finish, Real Valladolid opted to not exercise their buy to sign Porro.

Sporting CP 
On 16 August 2020, Porro joined Sporting CP on a two-year loan deal until 30 June 2022 with the option of making the move permanent for €8.5 million (£7 million). On 1 October 2020, he made his debut for the club in a 1–0 home win against Aberdeen in the third qualifying round of the UEFA Europa League. After arriving in Lisbon at the Estádio José Alvalade under some suspicion for young age, Porro immediately established himself as starter in the right side of the defence, making his league debut in a 2–0 away win against Paços de Ferreira. He scored his first goal for the Leões on 1 November in a 4–0 win over Tondela. For his outstanding performances for the club, Porro was named the Primeira Liga's Defender of the Month for three consecutive months, between November and January 2021. On 23 January, Porro scored the only goal in the defeat of Braga to help his club win the Taça da Liga. Three days later, Porro scored a shot outside the box, in a 2–0 away victory against Boavista. His strike was later voted as the Primeira Liga's Goal of the Month. He played 30 games for the eventual champions, ending a 19-year drought, while also being named in the Team of the Year.

At the beginning of the following season, Porro continued with outstanding performances, providing an assist for Nuno Santos in a 1–1 home draw against Sporting's rivals Porto, and scored two goals from the penalty spot on two consecutive league games, in a 1–0 win over Estoril on 19 September and a 1–0 win over Marítimo on 24 September, which earned him the Primeira Liga's Defender of the Month award for two consecutive months in August and September. On 24 November, Porro scored the third goal against Borussia Dortmund in a 3–1 home win at a group stage match of the 2021–22 UEFA Champions League, by converting the rebound after Gregor Kobel saved a penalty from Pedro Gonçalves, to ensure his team qualification to the round of sixteen, for the first time since the 2008–09 season.

Shortly after, Porro began suffering from recurring hamstring injuries, which sidelined him for two months of the season. He made his return from injury on 29 January 2022, with his crucial assist to Pablo Sarabia helping his team come from behind to defeat crosstown rivals Benfica 2–1 in the 2021–22 Taça da Liga final.

On 16 May 2022, Sporting triggered Porro's buyout clause of €8.5m (£7.2m) million, signing him on a permanent three-year deal with a reported €20m (£17.6m) million buy-back clause. Following a successful season, where he helped Sporting to a runner-up finish behind rivals Porto by scoring five goals and providing seven assists, he was named in the Team of the Year for a second consecutive season.

Tottenham Hotspur 
On 31 January 2023, the deadline day of the transfer window, Premier League club Tottenham Hotspur announced the signing of Porro on loan from Sporting with an obligation to buy in the summer. Porro made his Spurs debut on 11 February, starting in a 4–1 defeat to Leicester City. His performance drew criticism from former Spurs manager Tim Sherwood, who described Porro as "so bad it's unbelievable." He scored his first goal for the club on 18 March 2023 in a 3–3 away draw at Southampton.

International career
Porro earned his first cap for Spain at under-21 level making his debut on 29 March, starting in a friendly against Romania, which Spain won 1–0 win. In March 2021, Porro received his first call-up to the Spain national football team for the group stage of the 2022 FIFA World Cup qualification. He made his debut on 28 March 2021 in a 2–1 win against Georgia. Porro was named in Spain's final squad that finished as runner-up in the 2021 UEFA Nations League Finals in Italy in October, but did not make an appearance.

Career statistics

Club

International

Honours 
Sporting CP
Primeira Liga: 2020–21
Taça da Liga: 2020–21, 2021–22

Spain
UEFA Nations League runner-up: 2020–21

Individual
Primeira Liga's Defender of the Month: November 2020, December 2020, January 2021, August 2021, September 2021
Primeira Liga Goal of the Month: January 2021
Primeira Liga Team of the Year: 2020–21, 2021–22

References

External links
Profile at the Tottenham Hotspur F.C. website

1999 births
Living people
People from Don Benito
Sportspeople from the Province of Badajoz
Spanish footballers
Footballers from Extremadura
Association football defenders
Association football wingers
La Liga players
Segunda División B players
Primeira Liga players
Premier League players
CF Peralada players
Girona FC players
Real Valladolid players
Manchester City F.C. players
Tottenham Hotspur F.C. players
Sporting CP footballers
Spain under-21 international footballers
Spanish expatriate footballers
Spanish expatriate sportspeople in Portugal
Spanish expatriate sportspeople in England
Expatriate footballers in Portugal
Expatriate footballers in England
Spain international footballers